Yahşelli is a village in Menemen ilçe (district) of İzmir Province, Turkey.It is situated at  to the south of the Gediz River (ancient Hermus). The population of Yahşelli was 4000  as of 2011. 
The village suffered a great fire in August 2011 when more than 100 hectares of forestry was burned.

References

Villages in İzmir Province